Sir Leslie Orme Wilson,  (1 August 1876 – 29 September 1955) was a Royal Marines officer, Conservative politician, and colonial governor. He served as Governor of Bombay from 1923 to 1926 and as Governor of Queensland from 1932 to 1946.

Personal life

Wilson was the son of Henry Wilson, a stockbroker, and his wife Ada Alexandrina (née Orme), and was educated at St Michael's School, Westgate, and St Paul's School, London.

Wilson married Winifred May, daughter of Charles Smith, of Sydney, Australia, in 1909. They lived at the Manor House at Waltham St Lawrence in Berkshire. They had three children, two sons and a daughter:

 Peter Leslie Orme, born 4 June 1910 in London, farmer and grazier, died 6 July 1980 aged 70 years in Queensland and buried in Caloundra cemetery;
 David Orme, who was killed on 30 November 1941 in North Africa during the Second World War;
 Marjorie Orme.

On his retirement as Governor of Queensland, Wilson and his wife Winifred returned to live in Surrey, England. However, they visited Queensland on a number of occasions, including the marriage of their son Peter.

Wilson died after being hit by a truck while walking in September 1955, aged 79.

Military service

Wilson was commissioned into the Royal Marine Light Infantry and served in the Second Boer War, where he was wounded, mentioned in despatches and awarded the Queen's South Africa Medal with five clasps and the Distinguished Service Order. In 1901 he achieved the rank of captain.

From 1903 to 1909, Wilson served as aide-de-camp to the Governor of New South Wales, Sir Harry Rawson.

During the First World War Wilson commanded Hawke Battalion of the Royal Naval Division with the rank of temporary lieutenant colonel in the Royal Marines and fought at Gallipoli, where he was again mentioned in despatches, and in France, where he was severely wounded.

On 2 December 1915, Wilson was carrying dispatches on the Greek ship Spetzia when officers from a German submarine boarded the ship and captured him and another officer, Colonel Napier.

Political life

In January 1910, at the general election, Wilson unsuccessfully stood as the Conservative candidate for Poplar. In December 1910, he was Unionist candidate for Reading, but was defeated by the sitting Liberal candidate, Sir Rufus Isaacs, the Attorney-General.

In 1913 Wilson was returned to Parliament for Reading, a seat he held until 1922.
In 1919 Wilson was appointed Parliamentary Secretary to the Ministry of Shipping in the coalition government headed by David Lloyd George, a position he held until the Ministry of Shipping was abolished in 1921, and then served as Parliamentary Secretary to the Treasury from 1921 to 1922. He was also the Conservative Chief Whip.

At the 1922 general election Wilson abandoned his Reading constituency to contest the Westminster St. George's division, but was defeated by an Independent Conservative. However within a few weeks he was re-elected at a by-election at Portsmouth South. He was again Parliamentary Secretary to the Treasury from 1922 to 1923 under Bonar Law and later Stanley Baldwin, and was admitted to the Privy Council in 1922.

Vice-regal service

Governor of Bombay

In July 1923 Wilson resigned from this position and his seat in the House of Commons on his appointment as Governor of Bombay. Wilson remained in Bombay until 1928. In the 1929 New Years Honours he was appointed Knight Grand Commander of The Most Exalted Order of the Star of India.

Governor of Queensland

In 1932 Wilson was made Governor of Queensland, a post he held until 1946, one of the longest gubernatorial tenures in British history. He was the longest serving Governor of the state.

On 13 May 1937, Wilson planted a small bunya tree on North Quay, Brisbane to mark the name change of the River Road to Coronation Drive to commemorate the coronation of King George VI.

From 1932 to 1942, Wilson was the Chief Scout of The Boy Scouts Association's Queensland Branch, resigning in 1943 when he disagreed with the decision to make the Chief Commissioner a paid position.

Freemasonry

Wilson was a freemason. He was initiated into the craft in the Lodge Ionic No. 65, in Sydney, while serving as an aide-de-camp to Harry Rawson. When he returned to England, in 1909, he became a member of Navy Lodge No. 2612. He became Senior Warden of the Lodge in 1913 and Worshipful Master in 1917. He was the Primus Master of Old Pauline Lodge No. 3969 consecrated on Friday 18 July 1919. In 1922 he was appointed Junior Grand Warden of the United Grand Lodge of England and District Grand Master of Bombay in the following year. To this day there is a Lodge in Pune, Leslie Wilson Lodge No. 4880 EC, named for him. When he was appointed Governor of Queensland, he became Grand Master of Queensland's Grand Lodge serving for 12 years. The Master read a letter from the United Grand Lodge of Queensland, dated Wednesday, 14 June, covering a special dispensation to ballot at the same meeting. After the ballot, the Master declared Wilson was duly elected a member of Lamington Lodge. The following year, on Wednesday, 25 July 1934, Wilson was invested and installed as the Grand Master of the United Grand Lodge of Queensland. He was proclaimed as the Grand Master for the last time, on Wednesday, 24 July 1945, marking his entry upon his twelfth year as the Grand Master.

Honours

Wilson was appointed a Companion of the Order of St Michael and St George in 1916, a Knight Grand Commander of the Order of the Indian Empire in 1923, a Knight Grand Commander of the Order of the Star of India in 1929 and a Knight Grand Cross of the Order of St Michael and St George in 1937.

References

External links

Australian Dictionary of Biography Online

1876 births
1955 deaths
British Freemasons
Military personnel from London
British World War I prisoners of war
World War I prisoners of war held by Germany
Royal Marines officers
Royal Marines personnel of World War I
Royal Navy personnel of the Second Boer War
Knights Grand Cross of the Order of St Michael and St George
Knights Grand Commander of the Order of the Star of India
Knights Grand Commander of the Order of the Indian Empire
Companions of the Distinguished Service Order
Governors of Bombay
Governors of Queensland
Members of the Privy Council of the United Kingdom
Conservative Party (UK) MPs for English constituencies
UK MPs 1910–1918
UK MPs 1918–1922
UK MPs 1922–1923
People educated at St Paul's School, London
Road incident deaths in England
People from Waltham St Lawrence
British people in colonial India